Eddie Higgins is an eponymous album by jazz pianist Eddie Higgins recorded in Chicago in 1960–61 and released by the Vee-Jay label.

Track listing
All compositions by Eddie Higgins except where noted
 "Zarac, The Evil One" – 5:14
 "Falling in Love With Love" (Richard Rodgers, Lorenz Hart) – 4:34	
 "You Leave Me Breathless" (Friedrich Hollaender) – 4:25
 "AB's Blues" – 2:29	
 "Blues for Big Scotia" (Oscar Peterson) – 4:05
 "Foot's Bag" – 7:12
 "Satin Doll" (Duke Ellington, Billy Strayhorn, Johnny Mercer) – 4:19

Personnel
Eddie Higgins – piano
Paul Serrano – trumpet (tracks 1, 3 & 6)
Frank Foster – tenor saxophone (tracks 1, 3 & 6)
Jim Atlas (tracks 1, 3 & 6), Richard Evans (tracks 2, 4, 5 & 7) – bass
Marshall Thompson – drums

References

1961 albums
Eddie Higgins albums
Vee-Jay Records albums